Reluctant Persuaders is a BBC Radio 4 sitcom, written by Edward Rowett. It stars Nigel Havers, Josie Lawrence, Mathew Baynton, Rasmus Hardiker, Olivia Nixon and Kieran Hodgson, and was produced by Absolutely Productions. It ran for four series, with a Christmas special, between September 2015 and April 2021.

Plot
Reluctant Persuaders follows Hardacre's, 'the worst advertising agency in London'.

Cast
 Nigel Havers as Rupert Hardacre
 Josie Lawrence as Amanda Brook
 Mathew Baynton as Joe Starling
 Rasmus Hardiker as Teddy (series 1, 3, 4 and Christmas special)
 Kieran Hodgson as Teddy (series 2)
 Olivia Nixon as Laura

Episodes

Series One

Series Two

Series Three

Special

Series Four

Broadcast history
Reluctant Persuaders was originally broadcast on BBC Radio 4. Repeats have since aired on BBC Radio 4 Extra.

Awards
Reluctant Persuaders won the award for Best Scripted Comedy (Studio Audience) at the 2016 BBC Audio Drama Awards.

References

External links

BBC Radio comedy programmes
2015 radio programme debuts
BBC Radio 4 programmes